The Jobu Formation is a Cretaceous geologic formation of Late Cenomanian age. Dinosaur remains are among the fossils that have been recovered from the formation, although none have yet been referred to a specific genus. The oldest confirmed tyrannosaurid premaxillary tooth was recovered from the Jobu Formation. The mammal Sorlestes is also known from the formation.

Fossil content 
The following fossils were reported from the formation:
 Mammals
 Sorlestes mifunensis
 Dinosaurs
 Carnosauria indet.) (=Allosaurus sp.?)
 Ceratopsia indet.
 Tetanurae indet.
 Theropoda indet.
 Tyrannosauridae indet.
 Turtles
 Adocus sp.
 Shachemys sp.
 Nanhsiungchelyidae indet.

See also 
 List of dinosaur-bearing rock formations
 List of stratigraphic units with indeterminate dinosaur fossils

References

Bibliography 

 M. T. Carrano, R. B. J. Benson, and S. D. Sampson. 2012. The phylogeny of Tetanurae (Dinosauria: Theropoda). Journal of Systematic Palaeontology 10(2):211-300
 I. G. Danilov, V. B. Sukhanov, and E. V. Syromyatnikova. 2011. New Asiatic materials on turtles of the family Adocidae with a review of the adocid record in Asia. Proceedings of the Zoological Institute, Russian Academy of Sciences 315(2):101-132
 I. G. Danilov and E. V. Syromyatnikova. 2008. New materials on turtles of the family Nanhsiungchelyidae from the Cretaceous of Uzbekistan and Mongolia, with a review of the Nanhsiungchelyid record in Asia. Proceedings of the Zoological Institute RAS 312(1/2):3-25
 Holtz, T.R., Jr. 2001. The phylogeny and taxonomy of the Tyrannosauridae. pp. 64–83, in D.H. Tanke and K. Carpenter (eds.), Mesozoic Vertebrate Life: New Research Inspired by the Paleontology of Philip J. Currie. Indiana Univ. Press.
 D. J. Chure, M. Manabe, M. Tanimoto and Y. Tomida. 1999. An unusual theropod tooth from the Mifune Group (Late Cenomanian to Early Turonian), Kumamoto, Japan. In Y. Tomida, T. H. Rich, and P. Vickers-Rich (eds.), Proceedings of the Second Gondwanan Dinosaur Symposium, National Science Museum Monographs 15:291-296
 M. Manabe. 1999. The early evolution of the Tyrannosauridae in Asia. Journal of Paleontology 73(6):1176-1178
 T. Setoguchi, T. Tsubamoto, H. Hanamura and K. Hachiya. 1999. An early Late Cretaceous mammal from Japan, with reconsideration of the evolution of tribosphenic molars. Paleontological Research 3(1):18-28
 M. Tamura, Y. Okazaki, and N. Ikegami. 1991. [Occurrence of carnosaurian and herbivorous dinosaurs from upper formation of Mifune Group, Japan]. Kumamoto Daigaku Kyōiku Gakubu kiyō. Shizen kagaku 40:31-45

Geologic formations of Japan
Upper Cretaceous Series of Asia
Cenomanian Stage
Mudstone formations
Paleontology in Japan